Syed Modasser Ali FRCS, FRCOpth is an ophthalmic surgeon from Bangladesh and was the Health, Family Welfare and Social Welfare adviser to the Bangladeshi Prime Minister Sheikh Hasina, from 2009 to 2013. He is the founder of Mojibunnessa Eye Hospital, the first registered eye hospital in Bangladesh and founding editor-in-chief of the Bangladesh Ophthalmic Journal, the first peer-review ophthalmic journal in Bangladesh. He is regarded as one of the pioneers of Community Ophthalmology (public eye health) and his book titled Community Ophthalmology, published in 1985, is considered to be the first textbook on the subject by the British Journal of Ophthalmology. He is currently overseeing the Bangladesh Community Clinic programme as chair of the board of trustees. He is an executive board member of the World Health Organization (WHO), having previously served on the board twice before.

In 2013, Ali was named  as one of the 20 most innovative surgeons alive by healthcare education website Healthcare-Administration-Degree.net. He is also a recipient of Bangladesh National Personality Research Centre's Freedom Fighter Award for his services during the Bangladesh Liberation War.

Career
Ali was the Health and Family Welfare and Social Welfare adviser to the Bangladeshi prime minister, from 2009 to 2013, with the full rank and status of a senior cabinet minister. He was one of seven advisers (one of only five with a portfolio) to the government providing the prime minister and the cabinet advise on various national and international issues. He was also a member of the executive committee of the National Economic Council, the highest political authority for consideration of development projects in Bangladesh, during this time. He is currently overseeing the Bangladesh Community Clinic programme as chair of the board of trustees.

He was the Director-General of Health Services for the Bangladesh government in 2001, Dean of the Faculty of Postgraduate Medicine and Research at Dhaka University from 1998 to 2001, chairman of the Bangladesh Medical Research Council (BMRC) from 1998 to 2003 and director (and professor emeritus) of the National Institute of Ophthalmology in Dhaka, Bangladesh from 1997 to 2001. Under his chairmanship BMRC was awarded the prestigious WHO 50th Anniversary Primary Healthcare Development Award in 1998. He was also the president of the Ophthalmic Society of Bangladesh and in January 2015 the first peer-reviewed ophthalmic journal in Bangladesh, the Bangladesh Ophthalmic Journal, was launched with Ali as the founding editor-in-chief. He is currently the chairman of the governing body of Dhaka City College, one of the oldest colleges in Bangladesh, a member of the board of directors of Beacon Pharmaceuticals Limited (Bangladesh), the first manufacturer of anticancer drugs in Bangladesh, and has returned as chairman of the Bangladesh Medical Research Council.

Ali has been a lifelong anti-smoking campaigner and played a central role in the banning of smoking in public places  in his home country of Bangladesh where nearly 50% of adults use tobacco for recreational purposes. In his capacity as the health and family welfare adviser to the prime minister of Bangladesh, he oversaw changes in legislation to fully comply with the provisions of the WHO Framework Convention on Tobacco Control and was awarded the WHO World No Tobacco Day Award 2010 for his work on tobacco control. He was also the vice-president of the WHO Framework Convention on Tobacco Control (FCTC) representing the WHO South-East Asia Region from 2010 to 2012.

Political life
While studying for his medical degree at Dhaka Medical College, Ali was elected as the vice-president of Bangladesh Chhatra League, the student wing of Bangladesh Awami League. However, since then he has terminated any official affiliation with the Awami League, but has been the personal physician of the current Awami League president, Sheikh Hasina. He was active in negotiations with the military-backed Bangladesh caretaker government regarding sending Hasina, who was detained on corruption charges, abroad for treatment, and threatened to sue the government over negligence regarding Hasina's treatment during her detention in 2008. He also served as a government adviser to Sheikh Hasina, the current prime minister of Bangladesh, and was involved in the formulation of the prime minister's peace model presented at the 66th session of the United Nations General Assembly.

Books
Ali has authored several books on community ophthalmology and politics.
 Community Ophthalmology, Anamoy Publishers 1985, 
 Shontrasher Majhe Boshobash (Living within terrorism), Anannya 1993, 
 Shat Dashoker Chhatra Rajniti (60s' student politics), National Publication 2003

Personal life
Ali was born in Gopalganj, Bangladesh in 1946. He is married and has three children.

Hallmark Group loan scam 
On 29 August 2012, the Anti Corruption Commission of Bangladesh said they have information that Ali allegedly influenced Sonali Bank authorities into granting a scam loan to the controversial Hallmark Group, an allegation that he denied.  No charges were brought against Ali following an investigation by a specially convened parliamentary committee.

References

External links
 Prime Minister's Office, Bangladesh Government 
 The Executive Board, World Health Organization
 The Awami League

Bangladeshi ophthalmologists
Academic staff of the University of Dhaka
Fellows of the Royal College of Surgeons
1946 births
Living people
Awami League politicians
Dhaka College alumni
Dhaka Medical College alumni